Dinu Brătianu (January 13, 1866 – May 20, 1950), born Constantin I. C. Brătianu, was a Romanian engineer and politician who led the National Liberal Party (PNL) starting in 1934.

Life

Early career
Born at the estate of Florica, in Ștefănești, Argeș County, he was the son of the great Romanian statesman Ion Brătianu, and the brother of Ion I. C. Brătianu and Vintilă Brătianu. He studied engineering at the Bucharest Polytechnic and at the École des mines in Paris.

Although first elected to the Chamber of Deputies of Romania in 1895 (and was elected without interruption between 1910 and 1938), he held no governmental position until 1933–1934 (when he was Minister of Finance).

Under Carol and Antonescu
After the assassination of Prime Minister Ion G. Duca by the Iron Guard (December, 1933), he became head of the PNL. During the inter-war period, he became active in opposing the authoritarian regime of King Carol II and his Prime Minister Gheorghe Tătărescu.

After Carol's abdication and the fascist regime known as the National Legionary State, Brătianu offered his support to dictator Ion Antonescu, given that the latter's close relation with Nazi Germany had helped Romania win back territories it had lost to the Soviet Union (Bessarabia, Northern Bukovina, and the Hertsa region), taken back through World War II's Operation Barbarossa. The heavy losses inflicted on the Romanian troops and the successful offensives of the Red Army made Brătianu favor King Michael's plan to align Romania with the Allies.

Post–1945
After the August 23, 1944 Royal Coup, he was Minister without portfolio in two successive cabinets of Constantin Sănătescu. As leader of the PNL, he was unable to slow down the accession of Romanian Communist Party to power, as the appeal of the party had suffered major blows due to Brătianu's sympathy towards Antonescu.

He sought to oppose the communists by protesting to the American and British diplomats from Bucharest. Cortlandt Van Rensselaer Schuyler, the American general, portrayed the man who was supposed to fight communists: "Generally, Mr. Brătianu has disappointed me as a political leader", Schuyler wrote in 1945. "He is almost 80 and seems to be wasting his energy. Although he is very unhappy about the actual state of things, he has not offered a constructive programme for recovery, aside from a general opposition to what he calls the exorbitant and unjust demands set by Russia".

He refused to be part of the communist cabinet formed by Petru Groza on March 6, 1945. Arrested and imprisoned without trial, he died in 1950, probably in Sighet prison.

See also
Brătianu family

1866 births
1950 deaths
People from Ștefănești, Argeș
Dinu
National Liberal Party (Romania, 1875) politicians
Romanian Ministers of Finance
Members of the Chamber of Deputies (Romania)
Members of the Senate of Romania
Children of national leaders
Romanian people of World War II
Politehnica University of Bucharest alumni
Inmates of Sighet prison
Romanian people who died in prison custody
Prisoners who died in Securitate custody
Romanian democracy activists